Monck was a federal electoral district in the Canadian province of Ontario, which was represented in the House of Commons of Canada from 1867 to 1892. It is sometimes also considered one of Ontario's historic counties, as it was listed in some post-Confederation census records as a county of residence.

Monck consisted of the Lincoln County townships of Caistor and Gainsborough, the Haldimand County townships of Canborough, Dunn, Dunnville, Moulton and Sherbrooke, and the Welland County townships of Pelham and Wainfleet.

In 1872, it was redefined to include the Township of Dunn (Haldimand).  In 1882, it was redefined to include the Township of South Cayuga and exclude the Township of Caistor.

The electoral district was abolished in 1892 when it was redistributed between Haldimand and Monck and Lincoln and Niagara ridings.

Members of Parliament

This riding elected the following members of the House of Commons of Canada:

Lachlin McCallum (first term), Liberal-Conservative - 1867-1872
James David Edgar, Liberal - 1872-1874
Lachlin McCallum (second term), Liberal-Conservative - 1874-1887
Arthur Boyle (first term), Conservative - 1887-1891
John Brown, Liberal - 1891-1892
Arthur Boyle (second term), Conservative - 1892

Electoral history

References

External links
Library of Parliament website

Former counties in Ontario
Former federal electoral districts of Ontario